The 2008–09 season was Ross County's first season back in the Scottish First Division, having been promoted as champions of the Scottish Second Division at the end of the 2007–08 season. They also competed in the Challenge Cup, League Cup and the Scottish Cup.

Summary
Ross County finished Eighth in the First Division. They reached the first round of the League Cup, the fourth round of the Scottish Cup, and the final of the Challenge Cup, losing 3–2 on penalties to Airdrie United.

Results and fixtures

Scottish First Division

Scottish Challenge Cup

Scottish League Cup

Scottish Cup

League table

Player statistics

Squad 

|}

See also
 List of Ross County F.C. seasons

References

Ross County
Ross County F.C. seasons